Sioux Falls Seminary is a private Baptist seminary in Sioux Falls, South Dakota. It is part of Kairos University. It is also affiliated to the North American Baptist Conference.

History 
Its purpose was to train pastors for German-speaking people in North America. In 1931, the seminary became known as the German Baptist Seminary, and in 1945, it changed its name to North American Baptist Seminary. In 1949, the seminary relocated to Sioux Falls, South Dakota, in order to be more centrally located to its constituents. The name was changed from North American Baptist Seminary to Sioux Falls Seminary on May 18, 2007. In July 2009, the seminary moved into a new, environmentally friendly campus in central Sioux Falls, nestled on the eastern edge of the Augustana University campus. The institution is now known as Kairos University. In 2021, it became a founding member of the university network Kairos University.

Academics
Sioux Falls Seminary offers the Master of Divinity and Master of Arts degrees as well as the Doctor of Ministry degree, graduate level certificates, and non-graduates certificates.

References

External links
 

Education in Sioux Falls, South Dakota
Buildings and structures in Sioux Falls, South Dakota
Seminaries and theological colleges in South Dakota
Kairos University